Wyoming Highway 256 (WYO 256) is a  state road in Evansville, Wyoming, just east of Casper known as Cole Creek Road.

Route description
Wyoming Highway 256 begins its south end at an intersection with US 20/US 26/US 87 (Glenrock Highway) and the northern terminus of WY 253 in Evansville. The roadway that continues south of US 20/US 26/US 87 is Wyoming Highway 253 (Hat Six Road). The designation of WYO 256 ends and the roadway continues as Natrona CR 701 (Cole Creek Road).

Major intersections

References

Official 2003 State Highway Map of Wyoming

External links 

Wyoming State Routes 200-299
WYO 256 - US 20/US 26/US 87/WYO 253 to Natrona CR 701

Transportation in Natrona County, Wyoming
256